The deputy prime minister of Croatia (officially the Vice President of the Government of the Republic of Croatia) is the official deputy of the Prime Minister of Croatia. Article 109 of the Constitution of Croatia states that the cabinet is to be made up of the Prime Minister, one or more deputy prime ministers and other cabinet ministers. According to convention, if the governing parliamentary majority is a coalition of parties, all junior partners in the coalition will usually be given one deputy prime minister in the cabinet, with their rank usually being determined by the number of MPs the party has in Parliament. The deputy prime ministers are permitted to simultaneously hold a ministerial portfolio while in office, but may also serve without holding such a portfolio.

The Deputy Prime Minister of Croatia is not the constitutional successor of the Prime Minister and will not automatically assume the post of Prime Minister in the event of a vacancy. However, the Deputy Prime Minister may chair cabinet meetings in the event of the Prime Minister becoming temporarily incapacitated or otherwise unable to chair the meetings of his or her government cabinet.

History of the office
The office of the Deputy Prime Minister of Croatia was established on 31 May 1990, during the government of Stjepan Mesić. It was initially held by three people: Bernardo Jurlina, Mate Babić and Milan Ramljak. Since then 47 individuals have held the office, usually holding it simultaneously with several other people (e.g. the government of Jadranka Kosor at one point had six Deputy Prime Ministers). In addition, Deputy Prime Ministers may choose to combine their post with another government portfolio.

The current cabinet (in office since 19 October 2016) has four Deputy Prime Ministers: Damir Krstičević (since 2016), Marija Pejčinović Burić (since 2017), Predrag Štromar (since 2017) and Tomislav Tolušić (since 2018). Krstičević, Pejčinović Burić and Tolušić are members of the conservative Croatian Democratic Union (HDZ) party, which is the larger partner in the ruling coalition, while Štromar is a member of the center-left Croatian People's Party-Liberal Democrats (HNS), which is the junior partner. Previously Ivan Kovačić (Most), Davor Ivo Stier (HDZ) and Martina Dalić (HDZ) also served as Deputy Prime Ministers in the Plenković cabinet at some point.

List of deputy prime ministers
 Parties
 (43)
 (7)
 (4)
 (3)
 (2)
 (2)
 (2)
 (1)

 Note

Cabinet of Stjepan Mesić (1990)

Cabinet of Josip Manolić (1990–1991)

Cabinet of Franjo Gregurić (1991–1992)

Cabinet of Hrvoje Šarinić (1992–1993)

Cabinet of Nikica Valentić (1993–1995)

Cabinet of Zlatko Mateša (1995–2000)

First and Second cabinet of Ivica Račan (2000–2003)

First and Second cabinet of Ivo Sanader (2003–2009)

Cabinet of Jadranka Kosor (2009–2011)

Cabinet of Zoran Milanović (2011–2016)

Cabinet of Tihomir Orešković (2016)

First and Second cabinet of Andrej Plenković (2016–present)

See also
List of cabinets of Croatia

References

Government of Croatia
Croatia
Deputy Prime Ministers